The New Mexico Bowl is an NCAA-sanctioned post-season college football bowl game that has been played annually since 2006 at University Stadium, on the campus of the University of New Mexico in Albuquerque, New Mexico. Owned and operated by ESPN Events, it has typically been scheduled as one of the first games of the bowl season. The bowl has tie-ins with Conference USA and the Mountain West Conference.

Due to the COVID-19 pandemic, the 2020 New Mexico Bowl was moved to Toyota Stadium in Frisco, Texas.

History 
The New Mexico Bowl trophy is a  piece of Zia Pueblo pottery, painted with Pueblo symbols, the New Mexico Bowl logo, football players, and the logos of the competing teams. The Zia sun symbol, a Zia Pueblo symbol that is used in the state flag, is incorporated into the bowl game logo. The most valuable player trophies are crafted from traditional leather shields.

From 2011 to 2017, the bowl was sponsored by clothing manufacturer Gildan and was officially known as the Gildan New Mexico Bowl. In 2019, the bowl announced a sponsorship with DreamHouse Productions, a local film studio. However, in October 2019, the company was quietly dropped as sponsor, coinciding with investigations by a local sports website, EnchantmentSports.com, that alleged DreamHouse Productions was tied to a scam artist and questioned the company's legitimacy.

Game results

Source:

MVPs

Source:

Most appearances
Updated through the December 2022 edition (17 games, 34 total appearances).

Teams with multiple appearances

Teams with a single appearance
Won (5): Hawaii, Marshall, San Diego State, San Jose State, Temple

Lost (6): Central Michigan, Houston, North Texas, SMU, UTSA, Washington State

Air Force, Boise State and UNLV are the only current Mountain West Conference members that have not appeared in the bowl.

Appearances by conference
Updated through the December 2022 edition (17 games, 34 total appearances).

 The WAC no longer sponsors FBS football.
 Independent appearances: BYU (2022)

Game records

Source:

Media coverage

ESPN College Football holds the rights to televise the New Mexico Bowl. In 2006, the inaugural edition of the bowl, the game was carried on ESPN2, from 2007 to 2021 the game was carried on ESPN, In 2022, the game was carried on ABC.

References

External links
 

 
College football bowls
Recurring sporting events established in 2006